Volodymyr Kolomiets is a retired Ukrainian football player.

Career
Volodymyr Kolomiets started his career in 1995 with Desna Chernihiv, the main club in the city of Chernihiv.In the season 1996–97 he won the Ukrainian Second League. In 1999 he moved to Polissya Zhytomyr in Ukrainian First League in the season 1999–2000.In 2000 he moved to where he moved to Fakel Varva where he played 15 matches where he scored 2 goals and he won the Chernihiv Oblast Football Championship. In 2001 he played 4 matches with Yevropa Pryluky and 3 matches with Fakel Varva. In 2003 he moved to FC Nizhyn where he played 10 matches.

Honours
Nizhyn
 Chernihiv Oblast Football Championship 2004
 Chernihiv Oblast Football Cup: 2003, 2004

Fakel Varva
 Chernihiv Oblast Football Championship 2001, 2002 

Desna Chernihiv
 Ukrainian Second League: 1996–97

References

External links 
 Volodymyr Kolomiets at footballfacts.ru

1974 births
Living people
Soviet footballers
Footballers from Chernihiv
FC Desna Chernihiv players
FC Polissya Zhytomyr players
FC Fakel Varva players
Ukrainian footballers
Ukrainian Second League players
Association football defenders